The Tasman Bridge is a bridge that carries the Tasman Highway over the Derwent River in Hobart, Tasmania, Australia. The bridge has a separated pedestrian footway on each side. There is no dedicated lane for bicycles; however, steps to the pedestrian footway were replaced with ramps in 2010.

History 

In the 1950s with the development of the Eastern shore, it was decided to build a larger bridge; the old Hobart Bridge faced increasing difficulty in managing the larger volumes of traffic that came with development, and constantly raising the lift span for shipping was disruptive. In November 1959 Reed & Mallik were awarded a contract to build the bridge.

Construction commenced in May 1960 and the first two lanes bridge opened on 18 August 1964. The other two lanes opened on 23 December 1964. It was officially opened on 18 March 1965 by Prince Henry, Duke of Gloucester.

Disaster 

It caused two pylons and three sections of concrete decking, totalling , to fall from the bridge and sink the ship. Seven of the ship's crew were killed, and five motorists died when four cars drove over the collapsed sections before the traffic was stopped. A major press shot showed a Holden Monaro HQ and Holden EK perched balancing on the ledge.

The wreck of Lake Illawarra still lies on the bottom, with concrete slab on top of it, without presenting a navigation hazard to smaller vessels.

The breakage of an important arterial link isolated the residents in Hobart's eastern suburbs – the relatively short drive across the Tasman Bridge to the city suddenly became a  journey via the estuary's next bridge at Bridgewater. It was totally inadequate, carrying only eight cars on each crossing, and although ferries provided a service across the Derwent River, it was not until December 1975 that a two lane,  bailey bridge was opened to traffic,  to the north from Dowsing Point to Cleburne Point thereby restoring some connectivity. The bailey bridge remained in use until replaced by the Bowen Bridge in 1984.

The separation of Hobart saw an immediate surge in the small and limited ferry service then operating across the river. In a primary position to provide a service were the two ferries of Bob Clifford. He had introduced the locally-built ferries Matthew Brady and James McCabe to the river crossing, from the Hobart city centre to the eastern shore, shortly before the collision.

Reconstruction 
Reconstruction of the Tasman Bridge by John Holland commenced in October 1975. An important factor of the reconstruction is the improved safety measures. Some examples:
Large vessels passing beneath the bridge must now do so slightly to the west of the original main navigation span.
Personnel controlling ships (or harbor pilots) must be trained and then cleared for using the special laser lighthouse that indicates by colours whether the ship must be steered left or right to regain the centre line.
All road traffic is now halted whilst large vessels transit beneath the bridge.
On top of the new safety measures implemented, the bridge was further upgraded to hold a fifth lane. This upgrade included the construction of a lane management system which would enable the new middle lane to function as a reversible lane. The system consists of a traffic light system and a sign above each lane, pictured right. The signs, in conjunction with the traffic light system, employ a pulley system to periodically pull the signs over their appropriate lanes.

The middle lane points towards the city side (or western shore) during a.m. peak hours and points back towards the eastern shore during p.m. peak hours. The lane generally points towards the eastern shore during non-peak hours.

The Tasman Bridge repair took two years and cost approximately $44 million. The bridge reopened on 8 October 1977.

On 20 June 2007, a crane toppled whilst carrying out works on the bridge, and precariously hung for a number of hours off the side of the barriers.

LED upgrade

In 2019 the Hobart City Council commissioned Decrolux to convert the Tasman bridge's fluorescent lighting with modern LED lighting. Spanning almost  and utilising 1,930 LEDs, the project was completed in 2021. The lights are remotely programmable and have been used to celebrate Dark Mofo and the Hobart Hurricanes, as well as to show support for causes including Women's Health Week and Men's Health Week.

Gallery

See also 
List of disasters in Australia by death toll

References 

 Reference: Lewis, Tom. By Derwent Divided. Darwin: Tall Stories, 1999.
 Ludeke, M. (2006) Ten Events Shaping Tasmania's History. Hobart: Ludeke Publishing.

External links 

 Live webcam view of Hobart including the Tasman Bridge
 Traffic camera view of the Tasman Bridge
 Archival photographs of construction of the Tasman Bridge: page 1, page 2.
 1995 article about Tasman Bridge safety
 Hobart To Tasman Bridge 1938–2000
 

Bridges in Hobart
Bridges completed in 1964
Landmarks in Hobart
Roads with a reversible lane
Road bridges in Tasmania
River Derwent (Tasmania)
1964 establishments in Australia